Kaka (also Romanized as Kākā; also known as Kākeh) is a village in Anguran Rural District, Anguran District, Mahneshan County, Zanjan Province, Iran. At the 2006 census, its population was 183, in 37 families.

References 

Populated places in Mahneshan County